Rekha, is a Sanskrit word, meaning line. It is a common feminine given name in India and Nepal.

Rekha 

There are various figurative meanings of the name Rekha.  Some are:
 the lines of adorning deities or their followers, such as the three cross-wise white lines adorning Shiva's forehead or the two vertical lines adorning Rama's
 the written lines of the Vedas—the visual rendering of the text itself—considered sacred and beautiful as the means by which the tradition is preserved
 lines of light such as the radiance of the sun, moon or the halo of a deity
 the arc, journey, or path of a person or character in a story, or plot of the story itself

Notable people 
 Rekha, Indian Bollywood actress
 Rekha Mallick (born 1928), Indian Bollywood actress
 Rekha (Tamil actress), Indian Tamil film actress
 Rekha Bhardwaj, Indian playback singer
 Rekha Godbole, former Indian cricketer
 Rekha Hande, former Indian model and Miss India
 Rekha Punekar, former Indian cricketer
 Rekha Sharma, Canadian actress
 Rekha Thapa, Nepalese actress and model
 Rekha Yadav, Indian politician
 DJ Rekha, Indian musician and disco jockey
 Rekha Vedavyas, also known as Akshara, Indian Kannada film actress
 Rekha Maruthiraj, better known by her stage name Monica, Indian film actress
 Rekha, also Parvati/Sita and better known as Sugar and is life of Shiva/Ram

References

Indian feminine given names
Nepalese given names